Genius Chidzikwe (born August 3, 1979) is a former Zimbabwean professional tennis player, who played mainly on the ITF Futures tournaments. 

In the 2005 Davis Cup he played against future world number one tennis player 17-year-old Novak Djokovic and lost 4–6, 0–6, 4–6.

Singles titles

References
 http://www.daviscup.com/en/draws-results/tie/details.aspx?tieId=100006632

External links
 
 

Zimbabwean male tennis players
1979 births
Living people